Steve Adams (born Steven Saint Lawrence Adams, February 8, 1947) is an American author and screenwriter who uses the penname Waldo Mellon. He wrote Envy (2004), starring Ben Stiller and Jack Black. Adams conceived the idea with long-time friend Larry David. They met while both were comedy writers for Fridays, a Saturday Night Live inspired show in the early 1980s.   Adams also wrote Waiting for Forever (2010) starring Tom Sturridge, Rachel Bilson, and Blythe Danner as well as No Stranger Than Love (2015) starring Alison Brie and Colin Hanks.

In 2014, Adams wrote and self-published his first book What's What And What To Do About It under the pen name Waldo Mellon. The book was published in March 1, 2022 by Seven Stories Press.

Early life and family 
Adams's uncle is Kurt Vonnegut (1922-2007), an American novelist known for satirical, science fiction. In 1958, Adams' mother, Alice Vonnegut Adams, died of cancer two days after her husband, James Carmalt Adams, was killed in a train accident. Vonnegut, Alice's brother, adopted Adams and his three brothers and raised them in Cape Cod, Massachusetts. Adams graduated from Dartmouth College in 1969 with B.A. in English. He currently lives in Massachusetts, with his wife of 30 years Jeannie.

References

External links 

 
 
 
 What's What and What to Do About It by Waldo Mellon

Living people
American television writers
American male television writers
American sketch comedians
1947 births
American male screenwriters
Dartmouth College alumni
Television producers from New York City
People from Barnstable County, Massachusetts
Film producers from Massachusetts